Peter Beaumont CBE KC (born 10 January 1944) is a British barrister and retired judge.

Beaumont was called to the Bar at Lincoln's Inn in 1967 where he later became a Bencher in 2001.  He took silk in 1986, and served as a Crown Court Recorder from 1986 to 1989, before becoming a circuit judge.  Beaumont had previously sat at the Central Criminal Court (better known as the Old Bailey) since 1995, and was Common Serjeant of London from 2001 to 2004, being appointed Recorder of London in December 2004, following the sudden death of the previous Recorder, Judge Michael Hyam QC.

Beaumont retired from the judiciary in February 2013 and was succeeded as Recorder of London by Brian Barker; he was appointed Commander of the Order of the British Empire (CBE) in the 2013 New Years Honours.

References

External links 
 Curriers' Company website
 Next Recorder of London announced: His Honour Judge Brian Barker QC, City of London, 10 December 2012

1944 births
Living people
Alumni of Peterhouse Boys' School
Commanders of the Order of the British Empire
English barristers
20th-century English judges
20th-century King's Counsel
21st-century King's Counsel
English King's Counsel
Common Serjeants of London
Recorders of London
Circuit judges (England and Wales)
21st-century English judges